Valmy is both a surname and a given name. Notable people with the name include:

André Valmy (1919–2015), French actor
Christine Valmy (1926–2015), Romanian-American esthetician, consultant, and entrepreneur
René Valmy (1920–1977), French sprinter
Valmy Thomas (1925–2010), Puerto Rican baseball player